Hacker's Delight is a software algorithm book by Henry S. Warren, Jr. first published in 2002. It presents fast bit-level and low-level arithmetic algorithms for common tasks such as counting bits or improving speed of division by using multiplication.

Background 
The author, an IBM researcher working on systems ranging from the IBM 704 to the PowerPC, collected what he called "programming tricks" over the course of his career. These tricks concern efficient low-level manipulation of bit strings and numbers. According to the book's foreword by Guy L. Steele, the target audience includes compiler writers and people writing high-performance code.

Summary 
Programming examples are written in C and assembler for a RISC architecture similar, but not identical to PowerPC. Algorithms are given as formulas for any number of bits, the examples usually for 32 bits.

Apart from the introduction, chapters are independent of each other, each focusing on a particular subject. Many algorithms in the book depend on two's complement integer numbers.

The subject matter of the second edition of the book includes algorithms for

 Basic algorithms for manipulating individual bits, formulas for identities, inequalities, overflow detection for arithmetic operations and shifts
 Rounding up and down to a multiple of a known power of 2, the next power of 2 and for detecting if an operation crossed a power-of-2 boundary
 Checking bounds
 Counting total, leading and trailing zeros
 Searching for bit strings
 Permutations of bits and bytes in a word
 Software algorithms for multiplication
 Integer division
 Efficient integer division and calculating of the remainder when the divisor is known
 Integer square and cube roots
 Unusual number systems, including base -2
 Transfer of values between floating point and integer
 Cyclic redundancy checks, error-correcting codes and Gray codes
 Hilbert curves including a discussion of applications

Style 
The style is that of an informal mathematical textbook.  Formulas are used extensively. Mathematical proofs are given for some non-obvious algorithms, but are not the focus of the book.

Reception 
Overall reception has been generally positive.

Publication history 
The book was published by Addison-Wesley Professional. The first edition was released in 2002 and the second in 2013.

See also
 HAKMEM
 Popcount
 Find first set

References

Further reading

External links 
 Archive of Hacker's Delight website

2002 non-fiction books
2013 non-fiction books
Computer programming books
Addison-Wesley books
Computer science books